Gazoryctra novigannus is a moth of the family Hepialidae first described by William Barnes and Foster Hendrickson Benjamin in 1926. It is known in North America, from Quebec, west to the Rocky Mountains and south to Arizona.

References

Moths described in 1926
Hepialidae
Moths of North America